State Highway 202 (SH 202) is a Texas state highway between Beeville and Refugio.  The route was designated on January 9, 1934 from George West to Beeville as a restoration of the easternmost portion of the old SH 127 (which was reused on another road in 1932). On November 19, 1935, it extended west to Fowlerton. On December 21, 1936, it extended east to Refugio. By 1938, SH 202 was extended west to Cotulla (restoring more of the old SH 127) and east to Refugio. On September 26, 1939, the section of SH 202 west of George West was transferred to SH 72. On October 30, 1939, before signage was changed, SH 202 was extended to Laredo, replacing SH 257 (note that SH 202 east of George West was to be transferred to SH 257 on September 26, 1939). On August 24, 1954, the section from Laredo to Beeville became the new routing of U.S. Route 59, and was pared back to its present routing.

Route description
SH 202 begins at a junction with US 59 (Future I-69W) and US 181 Bus. in Beeville.  It heads south from this junction through Beeville briefly concurrent with US 181 Bus. until the two split with US 181 Bus. heading south and SH 202 heading east.  The highway continues to the east through Beeville to an intersection with FM 351.  Heading towards the east, the highway continues to a junction with US 181.  The highway continues to the east to an intersection with FM 2441.  SH 202 reaches its eastern terminus at US 183 and US 77 Alt. in Refugio.

Junction list

References

202
Transportation in Bee County, Texas
Transportation in Refugio County, Texas